Meiocampa is a genus of two-pronged bristletails in the family Campodeidae. There are about five described species in Meiocampa.

Species
These five species belong to the genus Meiocampa:
 Meiocampa arizonica Bareth and Conde, 1958 i c g
 Meiocampa hermsi Silvestri, 1933 i c g
 Meiocampa mickeli Silvestri, 1933 i c g
 Meiocampa newcomeri Silvestri, 1933 i c g
 Meiocampa wilsoni (Silvestri, 1912) i c g
Data sources: i = ITIS, c = Catalogue of Life, g = GBIF, b = Bugguide.net

References

Further reading

 
 
 

Diplura